Dalat is the administrative town of the Dalat district in Mukah Division, Sarawak, Malaysia. It is situated by the Oya river.

Etymology
According to Heidi Munan's book "How Dalat Got Its Name", Dalat was named following a bloodshed among three brothers as the village chief did not name a successor. Many people died in the war. Corpses lying in the village attracted flies. "Dalat" means fly in the Melanau language, and therefore, the locals named the village Dalat, which is now a small town.

History

Government
Dalat is represented at the State Legislative Assembly by Dato' Sri Hajah Fatimah Abdullah @ Ting Sai Ming, from Parti Pesaka Bumiputera Bersatu. She won the seat in the 18th State Election 2016 for the fourth time. For Parliament, Dalat district is under Parliament 213: Mukah.

Geography
Similar to most areas in the Rajang Delta, Dalat town and its land district is located on peat land that is categorized as deep peat (more than 150 cm).

Climate
Dalat has a tropical rainforest climate (Af) with heavy to very heavy rainfall year-round.

Demographics

According to the 2010 National Census, Dalat townland has a population of 619.

Most of the people use Melanau language to communicate here. There is a slight difference of the language between each villages, yet they can understand each other very well. Other languages such as Malay, Sarawak Malay, Iban, Mandarin, Hokkien and English are also widely spoken.

Main religions practised in Dalat are Islam, Christianity (Roman Catholic, Methodist and SIB), Buddhism, and Malaysian Chinese religion.

Economy

Dalat is reputed to be the largest sago flour producer in the world. The district has four modern sago factories with a total output of more than 74 tonnes per day.

The importance of the sago palm tree is evident in the district tagline.

Transport

Road
Dalat is connected by a single-carriage road to Mukah. There are daily express bus services connecting Dalat and Miri via Bintulu and Mukah.

Air
The nearest airport is Mukah Airport. The locals however prefer to use either Bintulu Airport or Sibu Airport to fly to Kuala Lumpur particularly.

Water
River transportation is still very vital in Dalat. There are speed boats connecting Dalat and Sibu with a fee of MYR 35. The journey takes approximately 2 hours.

Transport

Bus Express

Other utilities

Education
Dalat town has four secondary schools namely SMK Dalat, SMK Oya, SMK Batang Igan and SMK Agama Igan. In the town proper, there are three primary schools namely SJK (C) Chin Hua, SK Saint Bernard and SK Kampung Sungai Ud .

In January 2018, Centre Of Technical Excellence Sarawak (CENTEXS) Temporary Campus was officially launched by Dato Sri Fatimah Abdullah offering Textile & Hospitality courses for the first intake. She also announced the plan to build a new CENTEXS campus costing RM 50 million will be built near Dalat Welfare Complex.

Healthcare

The town is served by an eight-bedded public hospital, Dalat Hospital. Despite having the fewest beds among 22 public hospitals in Sarawak, it is equipped with facilities such as X-ray laboratory and a dialysis centre.

Since there is a good system of transportation, any needs which Dalat Hospital could not handle would be referred to Mukah Hospital or even Sibu Hospital.

Others
Dalat town also has a post office, district office, a hospital, a stadium (Stadium Perpaduan Dalat), a few blocks of shop-houses, a Catholic church (St. Bernard Church), a Methodist Church, a Chinese temple (age more than a century), a district mosque and a Senior Citizens’ Activity Centre (PAWE). In June 2017, a voluntary fire station was launched. The fire station is an interim measure to respond swiftly to fires as the nearest facility is in Mukah, some 40 minutes’ drive away. In December 2020,'Bazaarnita Fatima' and Phase 2 of Dalat Waterfront were officially opened by the Chief Minister of Sarawak, Datuk Patinggi Abang Abdul Rahman Johari bin Al-Marhum Tun Abang Haji Openg.

There is only one bank in Dalat which is a branch of RHB Bank.

Culture and leisure

The Melanaus are famous for their traditional food such as umai, sago worms and the sago pearls. The importance of sago palm to Melanau culture is celebrated biennially since 2005 in a festival called Karnival Balau Dalat(Balau Dalat Carnival). The festival was included in the 2020 Sarawak tourism calendar. Since 2008, Dalat Regatta (known locally Pesta Besaug Dalat) is held alternately with the Balau Dalat Carnival.

Other major celebrations are Christmas, Hari Raya Aidilfitri, Chinese New Year and Kaul Festival. Kaul Festival is a Melanau annual "cleansing" when traditionally, uninvited spirits and other bad influences were escorted out of the village by a flotilla of boats, and ceremonial offerings of food, cigarettes and betel nut were set on the seraheng (decorated pole). Each village celebrates the festival on different dates prior to the festival in Mukah — touted as the ‘Mother of All Kaul Festivals’ in third week of April.

Associations/ Clubs 
 The Dalat Melanau Association was registered on 9 September 2010 under Association Act 1966–33 with Registrar Of Societies Number PPM-002-13-09092010. The association aims to encourage Melanau at Dalat district to be more proactive and while helping to promote progress for local Melanau people. The club also aims to protect Melanau Dalat heritage and culture.
 Dalat Photography Club - Co-founded by well known freelance photographer Naising Bega who is famous for his artwork. Naising also acts as one of the instructors in this club. The club was registered on 6 November 2012 with ROS PPM014-13-06112012. The club initially known as Melanau Dalat Photography Club which made it early present on Pesta Bersaug Dalat in October 2010. It later renamed to Dalat Photography Club to encourage more people enter the club. The Patron of the club is Dalat state assembly woman Datuk Hajah Fatimah Abdullah @ Ting Sai Ming.

Literature
 Heidi Munan's short story 'How Dalat Got Its Name' is published in the book Melanau stories (2005) Utusan Publications. The short story was included in the Malaysian lower secondary school English literature curriculum from 2000 to 2009.
 The Kut Canal and Medong Village are also featured in the book Melanau stories (2005), in 'The Story of Kut Canal'.

Notable people
 Dato' Sri Hajah Fatimah Abdullah @ Ting Sai Ming - State Assembly Representative of Dalat and the current Minister of Women, Early Childhood and Community Wellbeing Development (Sarawak). She was born and raised in Kampung Teh, Dalat.
 Rozie Khan - fashion designer and founder of "Rozie Khan Couture". She is the winner of Best Designer award at the 2018 Borneo Fashion Week.
 Albert Bansa - documentary filmmaker, and the FreedomFilmFest (FFF) 2019 grant winner for the film "Pengidup Aku" (My Life).

References

Dalat District
Towns in Sarawak